Flavius Severianus (died 313) was the son of the Roman Emperor Flavius Valerius Severus.

Life and execution 
After his father died in 307 in Italy having surrendered to his rivals Maximian and Maxentius, Severus' young son Flavius Severianus sought refuge in the Eastern part of the empire under Galerius. When Galerius died in 311, Severianus suspected that Licinius intended to do him harm as a potential rival in his ambitions to rule the East and so he fled to Maximinus Daza in Asia who made him praeses (governor) of the province of Isauria. 

In August 313 Maximinus Daza went to war against Licinius. Severianus accompanied him on this campaign which ended in defeat for Daza. Severianus was captured following the death of Daza, and Licinius had him executed under the pretense that Severianus intended to assume the imperial office himself.

Practically all we know about Flavius Severianus comes from Lactantius.

References

313 deaths
4th-century Romans
Flavius Severianus
Flavii
Valerii
People executed by the Roman Empire
Executed ancient Roman people
Tetrarchy
Sons of Roman emperors